Louis-Léopold Boilly (5 July 1761 – 4 January 1845) was a French painter and draftsman. A gifted creator of popular portrait paintings, he also produced a vast number of genre paintings vividly documenting French middle-class social life. His life and work spanned the eras of monarchical France, the French Revolution, the Napoleonic Empire, the Bourbon Restoration and the July Monarchy. His 1800 painting Un Trompe-l'œil introduced the term trompe-l'œil ("trick the eye"), applied to the technique that uses realistic imagery to create the optical illusion that the depicted objects exist in three dimensions, though the "unnamed" technique itself had existed in Greek and Roman times.

Life and career

Boilly was born in La Bassée in northern France, the son of a local wood sculptor. A self-taught painter, Boilly began his career at a very young age, producing his first works at the age of twelve or thirteen. In 1774 he began to show his work to the Augustinians of Douai who were evidently impressed: within three years, the bishop of Arras invited him to work and study in his diocese. While there, he produced a cascade of paintings – some three hundred small works of portraiture. He received instruction in trompe-l'œil painting from Dominique Doncre (1743–1820) before moving to Paris around 1787.

At the height of the revolutionary Terror in 1794, Boilly was condemned by the Committee of Public Safety for the erotic undertones of his work. This offence was remedied by Boilly's eleventh-hour production of the more patriotic Triumph of Marat (now in the Musée des Beaux Arts, Lille) which saved him from serious penalties.

Boilly was a popular and celebrated painter of his time. He was among the first artists to produce lithographs, and became wealthy from the sale of his prints and paintings. He was awarded a medal by the Parisian Salon in 1804 for his work The Arrival of a Mail-coach in the Courtyard of the Messageries. In 1833 he was decorated as a chevalier of the nation's highest order, the Légion d'honneur.

Boilly died in Paris on 4 January 1845. His youngest son, Alphonse Boilly (1801–1867), was a professional engraver who apprenticed in New York with Asher Brown Durand.

Style and works

Boilly's early works showed a preference for amorous and moralising subjects. The Suitor's Gift is comparable to much of his work in the 1790s. His small-scale paintings with carefully mannered colouring and precise detailing recalled the work of seventeenth-century Dutch genre painters such as Gabriël Metsu (1629–1667), Willem van Mieris and Gerard ter Borch (1617–1681), of whose work Boilly owned an important collection.

After 1794, Boilly began to produce far more crowded compositions that serve as social chronicles of the urban middle class. In these works, his observation of contemporary customs is slightly sentimental and often humorous.

Boilly was also well respected for his portraiture. By the end of his lifetime he had painted about 5,000 portraits, most of which were painted on canvases measuring 22 cm x 17 cm (8 5/8 in. x 6 5/8 in.). He worked quickly, and boasted of requiring only two hours to complete a portrait. He painted both middle class sitters and prominent contemporaries such as Robespierre. Boilly's portraits strongly characterize the sitters as individuals, and are usually painted in a sober range of colors.

Boilly used his great skill in depicting textures to produce numerous illusionistic works, including paintings in grisaille that mimic prints. In the Salon of 1800 he exhibited a painting that depicted layers of overlapping prints, drawings, and papers, covered by a sheet of broken glass in a wooden frame. His title for the work, Un trompe-l'œil ("a trick played on the eye"), marked the first use of that term to describe an illusionistic painting. Although art critics derided the painting as a stunt, it caused a popular sensation, and trompe-l'œil entered the language as a name for an entire genre.

His interest in caricature is most apparent in his suite of 98 lithographs titled Recueil de grimaces, published between 1823 and 1828.

Boilly remains a highly regarded master of oil painting. A major exhibition of his work, The Art of Louis-Léopold Boilly: Modern Life in Napoleonic France, travelled to the United States where it was shown at both the Kimbell Art Museum in Fort Worth and the National Gallery of Art in Washington (1995). The Musée des Beaux Arts in Lille held a large-scale exhibition of Boilly's work during the winter season of 2011–2012.

Selected works

References

Further reading
 The Art of Louis-Léopold Boilly: Modern Life in Napoleonic France by Susan L. Siegfried (Yale University Press, 1995)
Romanticism & the school of nature : nineteenth-century drawings and paintings from the Karen B. Cohen collection by Colta Feller Ives (The Metropolitan Museum of Art, 2000)

External links

 Biography and links to many works {World Wide Art Resources}.  Careful: all kinds of pop-ups and dead links here.
 The Art of Louis-Léopold Boilly {Book Review}
 

1761 births
1845 deaths
People from Nord (French department)
French genre painters
French draughtsmen
18th-century French painters
French male painters
19th-century French painters
19th-century French male artists
18th-century French male artists